Jiangzhai is a Banpo phase Yangshao culture archaeological site in the east of Xi'an, where the earliest copper artifacts in China were found.

Excavated between 1972 and 1979, it is a prehistoric settlement site of the Neolithic period in the Yellow River Basin. The Jiangzhai site is about 6,700 years old and contains the remains of five different cultural phases of the Neolithic Yangshao culture such as the Hanpo type, Shijia type, Miaodigou type, Xiwangcun type and KeShanZhuang II type of the Longshan culture. It is the largest and most complete Neolithic village site discovered so far in the Yellow River basin. Of the site, 16,580 m2 has been excavated, resulting in the discovery of 600 tombs and 10,000 objects of interest, most of them being utensils such as pottery and bone utensils. Some brass artifacts were also found, the oldest copper artifacts found in China. The total area of the site is estimated at 50,000 m2, and consisted of a village with 100 homes.

The brass found in Jiangzhai is the oldest arsenical copper ever found, dated at 4700-4000 BC. However, the brass found at the site has many impurities, do not seem to be useful tools of any kind and have not been followed up by brass from descendant cultures, leading archeologists to believe that the Jiangzhai culture only created brass by accident and not systematically.

In 1996, the Jiangzhai site was designated by the State Council as one of national key cultural relics protection sites. As of September 2013, the Jiangzhai site is still in a mediocre state of protection, with only a concrete plaque above the ground identifying the National Key Cultural Relics Protection Unit, and the modern buildings above the ground being demolished.

See also 

 Chalcolithic (Copper age)

References

1972 archaeological discoveries
History of Xi'an
Archaeological sites in China
Chalcolithic sites of Asia
Former populated places in China
Major National Historical and Cultural Sites in Shaanxi
Yangshao culture
Populated places established in the 5th millennium BC